Primorsky is an urban locality (an urban-type settlement) in Khasansky District of Primorsky Krai, Russia, located on the Kedrovaya River  west of Vladivostok and  northeast of the district's administrative center of Slavyanka. Population:

History
It was founded in 1938 and granted urban-type settlement status in 1950.

Transportation
There is a railway station of the Ussuriysk-Khasan railroad in Primorsky.

References

Urban-type settlements in Primorsky Krai